Derecik District is a district in Hakkâri Province in Turkey. The district was created from Şemdinli in 2018 and has four villages. The district had a population of 23,461 in 2022.

The district is populated by Kurds of the Gerdî tribe with the Begzade tribe present in one village.

It borders the Erbil Governorate of Kurdistan Region in Iraq to the south and the local Gerdî tribe shares closer traditions and customs with the Gerdî Kurds residing on the Iraqi side than the Kurds of Yüksekova and Hakkâri.

Settlements 
The main town of the district is Derecik.

The four villages of the district:

 Anadağ
 Gelişen
 Ortaklar
 Uslu

The sixteen hamlets of the district:

 Adıgüzel
 Akören
 Aralık
 Bağlıca
 Beğendik
 Beşikağaç
 Bölek
 Gökçetaş
 Karakoç
 Koryürek
 Kütüklu
 Mordağ
 Ormancık
 Örencık
 Suçıktı
 Taşlıçay
 Toklu
 Ulaşan
 Yeşilova

Politics 

Population 
Population history of the district from 2018 to 2022:

References 

Populated places in Hakkâri Province
Districts of Hakkâri Province
States and territories established in 2018